Hell's Kitchen is a 1939 thriller Warner Bros. film starring The Dead End Kids and Ronald Reagan.

Plot
Buck Caesar is a paroled convict who makes a contribution to a reform school on the advice of his nephew, Jim Donahue, a lawyer. Jim feels that the boys in the reform school, including Tony, Gyp, Joey, Bingo, Ace, and Ouch, could benefit from the contribution, and he believes the publicity from it will help his uncle.

The superintendent, Krispan, does not want the contribution to lead to an audit, as he has been carrying two sets of financial books. He gets a professional hockey team to substitute for the team his school will be playing. His reasoning is that Buck will place a large bet on the school and lose, thereby getting him angry and possibly violent, which would violate his parole and send him back to prison. Buck does proceed to get angry, and punches the opposing coach, and then hides to avoid arrest.

Krispan continues in his role as ruler of the school, which had deteriorated under Buck's influence. As punishment for their actions while Buck was around, Krispan locks Joey into a freezer, and he dies. The other kids revolt and Buck comes out of hiding to aid them. The kids capture Krispan and make him go through a trial where they convict him to "join Joey". Buck, however, has gone to the police, and they arrive in time to stop them. Krispan is punished through the proper legal channels, and Buck returns to prison for violation of parole.

Cast

The Dead End Kids
 Billy Halop as Tony Marco
 Bobby Jordan as Joey Richards
 Leo Gorcey as Gyp Haller
 Gabriel Dell as Ace
 Huntz Hall as Bingo
 Bernard Punsly as Patrick Henry "Ouch" Rosenbloom

Additional players and supporting cast

 Ronald Reagan as Jim Donahue
 Margaret Lindsay as Beth Avery
 Stanley Fields as Buck Caesar
 Frankie Burke as Soap
 Grant Mitchell as Krispan
 Frederic Tozere as Mike Garvey
 Arthur Loft as Elmer Krispan
 Vera Lewis as Sarah Krispan
 Robert Homans as Hardy
 Charley Foy as Floogie
 Raymond Bailey as Whitey
 Robert Strange as Callahan
 Clem Bevans as Mr. Quill
 George Irving as Judge
 Lee Phelps as Bailiff
 Jimmy O'Gatty as Mug
 Ila Rhodes as Maizie
 Don Turner as Chick
 George O'Hanlon as Usher

Previous versions
The film is a remake of The Mayor of Hell (1933) starring James Cagney, and another Dead End Kids film, Crime School (1938).

Rating
The film was given an "H" rating (now known as an "X" rating) in the United Kingdom due to its violence.

Home media
The film was released as a double feature DVD by Warner Archives with On Dress Parade on January 22, 2013.

References

External links
 
 
 
 

1939 films
American black-and-white films
1939 drama films
Warner Bros. films
Films directed by Lewis Seiler
Films directed by E. A. Dupont
American drama films
1930s English-language films
1930s American films